The Red Lantern Corps is a supervillain and sometimes anti-heroic organization appearing in DC Comics. Their power is derived from the emotional spectrum relating to rage.

Publication history
They debuted in Green Lantern (vol. 4) #25 (December 2007) and were created by Geoff Johns and Ethan Van Sciver. Some of their characteristics were inspired by 28 Days Later, one of Van Sciver's favorite films.

Fictional group history
The Red Lantern Corps are first mentioned during the "Sinestro Corps War" storyline. Foreshadowing another major crossover event in the DC Universe, former-Guardian Ganthet reveals the Blackest Night prophecy to Hal Jordan, Guy Gardner, John Stewart, and Kyle Rayner. The prophecy describes a War of Light among seven Corps powered by the lights of the emotional spectrum. Part of the prophecy reads: "A force of hate will rise as the red lantern is anointed in blood, the bearer's rage unfiltered and unchecked."

According to DC continuity, before recruiting sentient beings to the Green Lantern Corps, the Guardians formed a robotic army called the Manhunters to maintain order across the universe. After eons of service, the renegade Guardian Krona altered their central programming, leading them to believe that the only way of maintaining order was to completely rid the universe of all known life. Sector 666 falls victim to this new philosophy when the Manhunters slaughter all but five of its inhabitants. The five survivors become known as the Five Inversions: a terrorist cell bent on the destruction of the Guardians of the Universe. They are incarcerated on the planet Ysmault, where one member, Atrocitus, is so consumed by his rage that it results in the formation of the first red power battery. Atrocitus had previously escaped at times, only to be defeated and returned. On one such occasion, he fatally attacked Green Lantern Abin Sur; but Atrocitus is returned to confinement by (then-Green Lantern) Sinestro. Atrocitus uses his power battery to bludgeon Qull and the other Inversions to death; however, he expresses more interest in exacting revenge on Sinestro.

Geoff Johns describes the Red Lantern Corps as likely being "the most violent of the Corps [...] based on violent reaction driven by emotional eruption – rage – instead of any clear-cut plan of war." He describes Atrocitus as "the most coherent and in control of the Red Lanterns," but notes that he will have trouble controlling the other, more feral members. Sinestro is their primary target.

As the power of rage consumes and drowns the intelligence of the users, the average Red Lantern is left in a barely animalistic mindset, with limited speech abilities and lacking any ability of abstract thought and understanding, and of every other form of volition but endless rage, driven by hatred and a dim memory of his past life, focused on the circumstances forcing him to hate in the first place. Atrocitus is able to restore his fellow Red Lanterns to their previous mental acuity with his shamanistic magic. The ritual, employed only once on Bleez, restored her previous mindset and capacity for coherent thought without dimming her rage. As such, Bleez, like Atrocitus, is still consumed by rage, but also loathes her endless suffering.

Rage of the Red Lanterns
In Final Crisis: Rage of the Red Lanterns, Atrocitus is shown in a flashback as having apparently formed a central power battery by using the blood of the other Inversions in blood magic rituals. The battery stands before a great lake of blood from which he forms his red power ring (crystallized by his anger), as well as other rings and batteries used to form the Red Lantern Corps. Harnessing the red light of rage, he sends his rings out into the universe; however, upon accepting the rings, his recruits' hearts are rendered useless. Their blood spoils from within, forcing them to expel the violently flammable and corrosive material from their mouths. Additionally, the Red Lanterns are reduced to an almost animalistic state, with only Atrocitus appearing to be in full control of himself. Once Atrocitus assembles a sufficient force, he leads them on a mission to capture Sinestro (who is being transferred to Korugar for his execution). Coincidentally, the Sinestro Corps have similar plans and they launch an ambush on the Green Lantern escort to rescue their leader. In turn, both groups are then ambushed by the Red Lanterns, who are able to take Sinestro captive by slaughtering Green Lanterns and Sinestro Corpsmen alike. Among the many Red Lanterns being seen by readers for the first time is one familiar face: former Green Lantern Laira. After being tried and found guilty for the murder of Amon Sur, she is expelled from the Green Lantern Corps. While being escorted away from Oa, her ship is attacked by a red power ring. It attaches itself to her, and provides her with a vehicle to achieve the vengeance against Sinestro that she seeks.

The introduction of the fully formed Red Lantern Corps continues in the main Green Lantern title, where Atrocitus brings Sinestro to Ysmault and intends to use his blood in another ritual. As Johns promised, Atrocitus strikes at Laira to keep her and the other Red Lanterns from attacking him themselves. With the help of Saint Walker and Brother Warth from the newly formed Blue Lantern Corps, Hal Jordan heads for Ysmault to free Sinestro (due to Ganthet believing he has an important role to play in the approaching Blackest Night conflict). Separating from his companions, Jordan finds Sinestro but is captured by the Red Lantern Corps. Just as Atrocitus orders Laira to kill him, the Sinestro Corps also arrives on Ysmault to rescue their leader. Chaos ensues, but it's temporarily relieved upon the arrival of the Blue Lanterns. The two are able to keep the battling factions from destroying one another for a time until Sinestro is released from confinement and kills Laira while Jordan attempts to calm her rage. Furious, Jordan's anger attracts Laira's ring and he becomes a member of the Red Lantern Corps himself. With his green power ring now inactive, Jordan attacks the Blue Lanterns and Sinestro. Saint Walker (whose powers are neutralized without the influence of a green ring) manages to get his blue power ring on Jordan's finger, which causes the red ring to explode when combined with the power of his reawakened green ring. Drained of power by Jordan's Blue Lantern abilities, the Sinestro Corps escapes. Wounded and seemingly beaten for now, Atrocitus and his own Corps also flee. At the conclusion of the issue, Atrocitus is seen using a blood ritual to locate the Blue Lantern Corps homeworld.

Sciencell riot
In Green Lantern Corps, Vice becomes the first Red Lantern to become a prisoner of the Green Lanterns. He attacks Kilowog and Salaak on the way back from the Red Lantern ambush, but is detained. Fixed with a muzzle to keep from using his corrosive plasma as a means of escape, he is placed in a sciencell on Oa. No longer under the allegiance of the Guardians, Scar removes the muzzle remotely as part of her own plans of bringing the Blackest Night prophecy into realization. Free of his restraints, Vice easily escapes and attacks the sciencell warden, Voz. To the amusement of the Sinestro Corps members imprisoned in their own sciencells, Vice overcomes and brutally assaults Voz. Sinestro's soldiers are horrified to find, however, that Vice is equally likely to attack them. As Vice begins culling the Sinestro Corps detainees, Scar releases their yellow power rings from confinement elsewhere on Oa. As the rings find their respective bearers, rioting ensues that necessitates the immediate attention of the Green Lantern Corps. The riot in the sciencells is eventually contained by the Green Lanterns and Alpha Lanterns. Vice, though given ample opportunity to escape, remains behind to shed more blood, and is subsequently captured and reimprisoned.

Blackest Night

During the Blackest Night event, the Guardians of the Universe are shown observing the War of Light unfolding among the various Corps of the emotional spectrum; one of the scenes depicting the Lost Lanterns confronting the Red Lantern Corps to retrieve Laira's body from Ysmault. As the seven Corps battle one another, a new eighth group powered by death is introduced to the DC Universe: the Black Lantern Corps. Black Hand, a leader of the new Corps, releases black power rings that reanimated the deceased to recruit members to their ranks. Just as Atrocitus steps into the fight against the Lost Lanterns, the black rings descend on Ysmault, seeking the bodies of Laira and the four deceased Inversions.

The passage taken from The Book of the Black at the end of Blackest Night #3 states that rage will be the second emotion to fall in the Black Lantern Corps' crusade against the colored lights. Love is depicted as being the first which is fulfilled in Green Lantern (vol. 4) #46, when the Black Lanterns devastate the Star Sapphires' homeworld of Zamaron. On Ysmault, the four Inversions attack Atrocitus and rip out his heart. However, the insatiable wrath contained within his ring prevents him from dying (having functionally replaced his heart), and temporarily destroys the Black Lantern Inversions. Later, Atrocitus is seen temporarily destroying the Black Lanterns in pursuit of Larfleeze, and demands that he surrender the Orange Central Power Battery. After a brief conflict over the Orange Central Power Battery, the two characters are joined by Hal Jordan, Sinestro, Carol Ferris, Indigo-1, Saint Walker, Ganthet, and Sayd. The group needs Larfleeze and Atrocitus to represent their respective colored lights in the emotional spectrum in a group effort to create a collective white light that will destroy the Black Lantern Corps. Atrocitus initially refuses to cooperate, but after deciding that the Black Lanterns are as much a creation of the Guardians as the Manhunter droids responsible for destroying his world, he changes his mind and complies. During the fight on Earth, Mera is temporarily inducted into the Red Lantern Corps as a 'deputy' to help hold the line against the Black Lanterns, but Wonder Woman is able to use her Star Sapphire ring to hold back Mera's rage and grant her a degree of control, with the ring being removed completely when Aquaman is resurrected as Mera's love for him compromises her rage (although Carol and Saint Walker are required to restart Mera's heart).

During the Black Lantern siege of the Green Central Power Battery, Kyle Rayner and Guy Gardner release Vice; hoping that the Red Lantern will be able to destroy the Black Lanterns faster than they can regenerate, thereby weakening a giant black construct attempting to destroy the battery. Believing that Vice has escaped (rather than being released), Alpha Lantern Chaselon kills him. Vice's ring later attaches itself to Guy Gardner, who has become full of rage following Kyle Rayner's death. Using both his green and red power rings, Guy slaughters dozens of Black Lanterns. After the planetary Green Lantern Mogo manages to neutralise the Black Lanterns, Guy turns his rage on his fellow Green Lanterns. Mogo uses a special pool of antibodies to remove most of the Red Lantern energies from Guy's body, telling him the only way to completely cleanse him is to bathe in the light of a Blue Lantern. Guy temporarily returns to the Red Lanterns when he uses Atrocitus's ring to fight off the Green Lantern Corps under Krona's control- Guy's green ring being compromised and reasoning that he has some experience with the red ring, while Atrocitus has been trapped in the Book of the Black by Krona- with Kyle Rayner's temporary blue ring allowing him to fully heal Guy of the red ring's influence once the crisis is over and Atrocitus has been freed.

The New 52 and solo title
In September 2011, The New 52 rebooted DC's continuity. In this new timeline, the Red Lantern backstory, despite having not been radically altered, was explained and expanded in the eponymous series written by Peter Milligan, ultimately released after the end of the "Flashpoint" storyline.

After the end of the War of the Green Lanterns, disappointed at the fact that he was not the one who killed Krona, the culprit of the Ryut Massacre, Atrocitus, feeling his rage dimming, is left without a purpose and faced with the drawbacks of leading an army of devolved, animalistic underlings driven by rage only. He decides to choose an individual to be his equal and right hand, on whom to bestow his or her full mental faculties. He chooses Bleez, but soon believes she may have manipulated him into doing this. At the same time on Earth, after watching his brother being beaten to death, a young Englishman named Jack Moore becomes a Red Lantern, subsequently helping Atrocitus when other Red Lanterns turn on him due to his rage having lessened.

Bleez becomes the Red Lantern representative in the New Guardians team consisting of seven representatives from the seven different Corps working together for mutual interest. The group investigates a mysterious Orrery in the Vega System, traveling back to Earth with Kyle Rayner to recover his power battery after he is officially discharged from the Green Lantern Corps – while retaining his ring and access to the Oan network – to protect him if the Guardians should try and capture him.

Following the defeat of the powerful Volthoom, Hal Jordan sends Guy Gardner to join the Red Lanterns as an undercover operative to keep them in check, with Guy swiftly defeating Atrocitus and taking command of the group. It is revealed that part of his decision to join with the Red Lanterns is feeling as if he has never fit in as a Green Lantern. As a Red Lantern Gardner manages to keep his rage in check, successfully leading most of the Red Lanterns; Atrocitus leads a splinter group and allows new Red rings to cause murderous justice-based rampages to continue. After joining with the Green Lanterns to defeat the cosmic terrorist Relic, Hal promises to give the Red Lanterns a sector for them to watch over after Guy rejects the initial offer of being released from his new role in the Corps. However, this sector becomes Sector 2814, where Earth resides, giving guardianship of Earth to the Red Lantern Corps.

Both Gardner's Red Lanterns and Atrocitus' Red Lanterns come into conflict with each other, which ends when a recently inducted Red Lantern, Judge Sheko, determines that Atrocitus, his Red Lantern splinter group, and herself are all guilty and she destroys them. However, Atrocitus and Dex-Starr survived but are apparently killed when Guy takes control of all of Atrocitus' newly created Red Power Rings, stripping them of their rings and removing their life support.

In Green Lantern: The Lost Army, Guy Gardner is flung into the pre-Universe and is suddenly wearing both a Green and Red Power Ring. He manages to reunite with the Green Lantern Corps who were also trapped in the pre-Universe. During the last fight between the Green Lantern Corps and the various Lightsmiths, Guy's Red Power Ring is turned green. In Green Lantern Corps: Edge of Oblivion, Guy is once again a fully fledged Green Lantern and helps the others to try and escape the impending death of the pre-Universe and back into their own.

DC Rebirth
As part of DC Rebirth, it is revealed that Atrocitus and Dex-Starr are alive and Red Lanterns once again, with the former regaining his title as their leader, and Bleez is once again allied with Atrocitus. Atrocitus wishes to bring forth the Red Dawn and obtain a mysterious new power ring that has been recently discovered. Atrocitus begins to bring forth the Red Dawn by implanting a Hell Tower within Earth and converting humans into rage conduits, waiting until the Hell Tower is ready to insert a Rage Seed. The Red Lanterns head to Earth to make sure their plans proceed on schedule and Bleez heads off to deal with Green Lanterns Simon Baz and Jessica Cruz. Simon Baz somehow heals Bleez, restoring her to her original form. Bleez reveals Atrocitus' plan to Simon but when Jessica intervenes and attacks Bleez, she succumbs to rage once more and returns to her Red Lantern appearance, deciding to go into hiding from the Green Lanterns and Atrocitus. Jessica Cruz inadvertently becomes a rage conduit and attacks Simon. Simon is able to purify her in a similar way he did to Bleez, and the two are then confronted by Atrocitus and a group of Red Lanterns.

Prominent members
Only a few of the Red Lanterns have been identified by name in Green Lantern titles. Many of the known Red Lanterns were victimized by the Sinestro Corps before becoming Red Lanterns.

Leadership
 Atrocitus (of Sector 666): He was formerly the only Red Lantern that had complete control over himself (unlike the other feral members of the Red Lantern Corps) and also led the Corps until the induction of Guy Gardner, who killed Atrocitus with his bare hands after removing his power ring and took leadership from him. However, while every Red Lantern believes Atrocitus to be dead, he was actually saved by Dex-Starr who was able to create a heart construct to replace the one he lost during the Blackest Night saga. Vowing to get revenge on Guy Gardner, Atrocitus then went to Sector 718 to look for a replacement ring. When he reached the planet Styge Prime, he found the embodiment of Rage, the Butcher, in captivity. After he and Dex-Starr defeated his captors, Atrocitus was able to possess the Butcher, thereby regaining his powers and possibly becoming more powerful. However, the entity is taken away by Kyle Rayner and the other entities, excluding Parallax who is still under Sinestro's control. Atrocitus and Dex-Starr then find another feral Red Lantern, kill it and take its ring. He then captures Rankorr and forces a bug inside him to make him feral. He then poisons the blood on Ysmult and, using a second lake on Styge Prime, he creates hundreds of rings and sends them to Earth. He then uses these newly formed reds from earth to fight Guy Gardner, but Gardner beats him by proving his rage greater than Atrocitus' and taking away his ring along with Dex-star's and all the newly formed reds as well. Although it is presumed he is dead, Gardner still refers to him as alive. Atrocitus is revealed to be alive and a Red Lantern again, having regained control of the Lantern Corps he founded. He plans to bring forth the Red Dawn on Earth.
 Guy Gardner (of Sector 2814): After Kyle Rayner's presumed death in Green Lantern Corps (vol. 2) #43, Guy is consumed by rage, attracting Vice's red power ring in the following issue. Like Hal Jordan, Guy is notable as one of the few Red Lanterns capable of creating red light constructs. Uniquely, Guy maintains control of his green power ring as well and is capable of using both in conjunction. Guy is able to overcome the red ring's influence with the aid of Mogo; however, the planetary Green Lantern warns Guy that some influence of the red still remains and that only a Blue Lantern's power ring could completely remove it. During the "War of the Green Lantern Corps" story-arc, Guy is forced to remove his green power ring to avoid being contaminated by the yellow impurity. Later, Hal Jordan gave him the choice of another power ring so they could fight against Krona, which he chose the red ring due to his previous experience with it. Afterwards, Kyle Rayner uses Saint Walker's ring to purify Guy from the effects of the ring. Following the defeat of Volthoom, the First Lantern, Guy was tasked by Hal Jordan to go undercover and re-enlist with the Red Lanterns as a mole, given Gardner's rage issues and the fact that the red ring turns its user into a violent lunatic. It's no small request, especially since Gardner had only just purged its effects from his system. Following the conflict with Relic, Gardner chose to remain with the Red Lanterns and arranged for them to gain jurisdiction over Sector 2814. Under Gardner's leadership, the Red Lantern Corps began to hunt down criminals and tyrants across the universe. However, unlike the Green Lanterns who delivered their prey to the authorities, Gardner's Red Lanterns executed them. Following the decimation of his forces from Atrocitus' uprising and the conflict with the New Gods, Guy is no longer a Red Lantern and is a Green Lantern once again.

Ring bearers
 Bleez (of Sector 33): A princess from the planet Havania who was kidnapped by the Sinestro Corps during a visit by suitors and then tortured and raped while imprisoned on Ranx the Sentient City. However, it was due to her vow to exact vengeance on those who kidnapped her that she was bailed out of captivity by a red power ring that saved her from being caught escaping during a Green Lantern assault on Ranx and deformed her into a member of the Red Lantern Corps. In early appearances, she is seen as only having one skeletal wing, the partner of which, Shane Davis suggests, was removed during her imprisonment. In Blackest Night: Tales of the Corps #2, the power of her red ring reduced her two feathered wings to bone; her depictions with one wing are retconned. In her current backstory, both her wings were mutilated during her torture, thus having the ring "heal" them in their current skeletal form. Bleez serves as the representative of the Red Lanterns Corps in the Green Lantern: New Guardians series prior to the "Rise of the Third Army" crossover event. Atrocitus also restored Bleez' intelligence to assist him in maintaining his control over the other animalistic Red Lanterns.
 Dex-Starr (of Sector 2814): An abandoned stray blue house cat from Earth adopted by a single woman in Brooklyn who names him Dexter. During a break-in, his owner was killed and he was evicted by police. Homeless, he was grabbed by two street thugs and thrown off the Brooklyn Bridge, but the rage he felt caught the attention of a red power ring and it came to him before he hit the water. As a member of the Red Lantern Corps, he killed the two thugs and slept on their skulls, proclaiming himself to be a "good kitty" using thoughts expressed in simple sentences. He was described by Geoff Johns in an interview with Wizard as "the most sadistic and malicious" of the Red Lanterns. Originally intended as a joke by Shane Davis, he began being featured more prominently due to positive reception. Dex-Starr frequently travels with Atrocitus, his vengeful quest centering on finding the burglar that murdered his owner. Dex-Starr gained the ability to create constructs after drinking Rankorr's blood, and unbeknownst to his fellow Red Lanterns, he used this ability to save Atrocitus from certain death.
 Rankorr (Jack Moore) (of Sector 2814): A child punk from Earth who was taken in alongside his brother, Ray, by their grandfather after their mother died. Ever since, he always repressed his growing feelings of rage over the tragedy by attending Oxford University and reading books, until he witnessed his grandfather's murder during a robbery committed by his old classmate Baxter and Ray's brutal beating at the hands of the local police, who caught him trying to firebomb Baxter's house. Unable to repress his feelings anymore and going out to rescue Ray, Jack unknowingly allowed a red power ring that appeared before him to induct him into the Red Lantern Corps, becoming the fifth human to bear a red power ring after Hal Jordan, Mera, Guy Gardner and Kyle Rayner (the sixth terrestrial including Dex-Starr). After killing one of the officers and escaping, Jack went after Baxter, who was being transported to a safe house by the police in a van, but was stopped by Guy Gardner, who Jack pleaded for help after rescuing from getting run over by a truck. Only too late could Jack be helped as his ring transported to Ysmault for training. As with Hal and Guy, Jack Moore manages to hold on part of his rationality, and he is one of the few able to create constructs. After giving his grandfather's grave a last farewell, he decides to avenge him and his brother by slaying his killer, the man he held responsible by trying to smash him with his grandfather's tombstone, but he's prevented from doing so by Guy Gardener. He was then confronted by Guy, making the Green Lantern Corps aware of his existence, until he is called to Ryut to join Atrocitus in his fight towards Abysmus and the Abysmorphs. He is made a true red after he finally kills the man responsible for his grandfather's death. His construct creation ability can be gained by other red lanterns if they drink his blood.
 Skallox: A loyal goat-headed member of a crime syndicate hired to commit acts of violence by a man named Lancer. Lancer wrongly accuses Skallox of disloyalty and throws him in an oven, burning his head into what resembles a goat skull. Skallox, enraged by what he was turned into, was then visited by a red power ring that crashed through the oven window and convinced him that he'd deserve better respect as a member of the Red Lantern Corps. He is shown among the Red Lanterns during Final Crisis: Rage of the Red Lanterns and then named in Blackest Night #0. Part of his origin story is shown in the Red Lantern series, after Atrocitus throws him into the blood ocean. Skallox is killed by Atrocitus when the latter snaps his neck. However, he is shown to be alive and allied with Atrocitus once more.
 Ratchet: A large floating brain with jellyfish-like features that is shown among the Red Lanterns during Final Crisis: Rage of the Red Lanterns and then named in Blackest Night #0. In Red Lanterns #4 and 5, his origin story is revealed after Atrocitus throws him in the blood ocean on Ysmault. First depicted as a small, alien life form not resembling his current jellyfish-like appearance, he was mutilated and deformed for defying his culture's rule of physical isolation. Finding a place with the Red Lanterns, his rage, born of his forced isolation, gradually starts to diminish. Before it can fade completely, he sacrifices himself in battle.
 Zilius Zox (of Sector 3544): First shown in Final Crisis: Rage of the Red Lanterns, he devours a Sinestro Corps member during Sinestro's abduction. He appears to be the same species as late Green Lantern Galius Zed. In Red Lanterns, Atrocitus throws him into the blood ocean in an attempt to restore his intelligence like Bleez. Zilius Zox joins Guy Gardner's Red Lanterns and in Red Lanterns Annual #1 he is fatally injured by Rankorr (who was possessed by Red Lantern Votun). Zilius Zox sacrifices himself to crash his ship into Atrocitus' Red Lantern Temple and destroy the new Blood Lake. However, he is shown to be alive and allied with Atrocitus once more.
 The Judge (Judge Sheko) (of Sector 775): Once chief judge of her home planet of Primeen, whose society was hideously steeped in corruption and decadence. The concepts of law and order were disreputably bought and sold by those rich enough and powerful enough to afford to have them changed or annulled. This greatly irked Sheko to no end for the past couple of decades. But her fury didn't come to a head until the duplicitous king's son she intended to have punished accordingly had her own bailiff kill her in front of a courtroom. As she died while drowning in the pools where justice is carried out, she finally let the slowly budding fury that she kept close to her heart consume her. It was then when a red rage ring called out to her and transformed her into a monstrous personification of that fury. Unlike other newly created lanterns, Sheko retained her logical mindset but was still under a cold, ruthless, tranquil fury which pushed her to violently judge and murder everyone around her, starting with her traitorous aide and the debauched royal family. After that, she began playing judge, jury, and executioner with everyone in the city she once called home. She was stopped by Guy Gardner's sect of Red Lanterns before Atrocitous could sway her to his side using the blood of Ysmault to bring back her rationality. Atrocitus tried to recruit her into his Red Lantern Corps but she wishes to 'judge' both factions and goes to see Gardener's reds. Finally, during the Atrocities storyline of the Red Lanterns, she deems Atrocitus and herself guilty as well and generates a mental blast that kills her and renders the guilty reds unconscious. 
 Veon (of Sector 435): A purple alien with one eye and one of Atrocitus's first recruits, he is shown in Final Crisis: Rage of the Red Lanterns and named during Hal's attempted rescue of Sinestro when his ring says "Veon rage." In Green Lantern (vol. 4) #45, he is killed by Boodikka when the Green Lanterns retrieve Laira's body from Ysmault.
 Vice (of Sector 13): The most ruthless of the Red Lanterns, whose mate was murdered by the Sinestro Corps drill sergeant, Arkillo. His forehead and jaw contain spikes which he uses to decapitate his enemies. He is later captured and sent to the sciencells on Oa, but is freed by Scar. He starts a riot among the prisoners, attacking Green Lanterns and Sinestro corpsmen alike. He is later killed by Alpha Lantern Chaselon during an attack by the Black Lanterns.
 Laira (of Sector 112): A former Green Lantern who is chosen by a red power ring after being punished and expelled for killing Amon Sur. Her rage regresses her to a semi-feral state capable of saying little more than "Sinestro." Hal Jordan meets her again on Ysmault and attempts to calm her rage, but she is killed by Sinestro.
 Abyssma: First identified by name by Ethan Van Sciver during an interview, Hal Jordan is shown fighting this Red Lantern during a battle between the Corps.
 Antipathy: A favorite creation of Ethan Van Sciver, she is shown fighting Soranik Natu during the epic battle between the Corps. She is distinguished as being one of the few Red Lanterns to create constructs using her ring, as she is depicted wielding scissor-like blades made of red light.
 Fury-6: First identified by name in the promotional imagery contained inside Blackest Night #0, he was first seen as a participant in the abduction of Sinestro.
 Haggor: First identified by name in the promotional imagery contained inside Blackest Night #0, he is similar in appearance to Abyssma.
 Nite-Lik: Unique to the members of the Red Lantern Corps, Nite-Lik was designed specifically for Mattel’s series of Green Lantern figures by Four Horsemen Studios and was named after Mattel's Scott Neitlich by Geoff Johns. The packaging for Nite-Lik's figure (which is a body that includes interchangeable heads for Nite-Like and Skallox) states that his first appearance is in Green Lantern  (vol. 4) #61, however, he doesn't actually make his debut until the first issue of Red Lanterns.

Former members
 Supergirl (Kara Zor-El) (of Sector 2813): The biological cousin of Superman. In the New 52, the grief and rage from her past experiences attracts a red power ring to her. After being captured by the Green Lantern Corps, she is taken to Ysmault and the Blood Lake restores her sanity where she joins Guy Gardner's Red Lantern group. She is later discharged by Guy so she doesn't need to die needlessly in the coming war against Atrocitus. Later, to avoid being possessed by an alien armor, she removes her ring while at the core of Earth's yellow sun, but survives due to the healing factor from her Kryptonian powers as a result of absorbing so much yellow solar radiation. She is the only known former member of the Red Lantern Corps who has been able to destroy her own ring and did not need to be purified by a Blue Lantern afterwards.
 Hal Jordan (of Sector 2814): A Green Lantern officer given a red power ring during his attempt to rescue Sinestro from the Red Lanterns and to calm Laira's rage, only to have Sinestro kill her just as he appears to be breaking through. Enraged, Laira's red power ring detects Hal's anger and forces itself onto his finger, temporarily transforming him into a member of the Red Lantern Corps. Hal is able to overcome the red ring's influence with the aid of the Blue Lantern Corps.
 James Kim (of Sector 2814): A man whose daughter was cruelly murdered. Though not in possession of a red power ring, as the host of The Butcher, he has no need for one.
 Krona (of Sector 0): During the War of the Green Lanterns, Krona was briefly able to take control of Atrocitus' ring and the other six rings, using them against the Green Lantern Corps, but the ring returned to its master after Hal Jordan killed Krona.
 Mera (of Sector 2814): The queen of the underwater kingdom of Atlantis. Mera is chosen as a deputy Red Lantern during the war against the Black Lantern Corps. When Aquaman is later resurrected by the White Entity, Mera's love for him severs the connection to her ring. Fortunately, she is spared from death through the combined efforts of Carol Ferris and Saint Walker.
 Spectre (of Sector 2814): After being freed of the possession of a black power ring by Parallax during the Blackest Night event, Atrocitus attempts to recruit the Spectre to the Red Lantern Corps. After taking on the Red Lantern symbol and signature regurgitation of blood, The Spectre is able to shrug off the effects of the intrusion (explaining that he is God's rage, not Atrocitus').
 Kyle Rayner (of Sector 2814): One of the six Green Lanterns of Earth, Kyle had become a "magnet" to all the corps rings with one red ring appearing to him claiming him as its bearer. It has since been revealed that Kyle must channel all the powers of the emotional spectrum while without possessing a red ring, he can access, at will, the powers of the red light, also turning him disturbingly cold when he does.
 Superman-Prime (of sector 2813): Superman-Prime temporarily becomes a member of the Red Lantern Corps during the Blackest Night storyline as his rage causes the black power ring that tries to turn him into a Black Lantern to temporarily turn him into a Red Lantern.
 Lobo (of Sector 3500): During the Brightest Day story, Atrocitus hired Lobo to attack the leader of the Red Lanterns to gain the trust of Hal Jordan, Carol Ferris, and Sinestro. As payment for his services, Atrocitus rewarded Lobo with a red ring. It is unknown if the ring was ever used.

Entity
The red rage entity is called The Butcher and takes the form of an Earth bull with a forehead bone structure resembling the Red Lantern symbol, created by the first act of murder. As with the other emotional entities, the Butcher was attracted to Earth by the Entity and is hunted by Krona. The white Entity intones for Hal, Carol, and Sinestro to find them before it is too late. According to Atrocitus' divining ritual, the Butcher can be found in the northwestern United States. The Butcher goes on the run all the while trying to find a host. Atrocitus is currently searching for it, along with Dex-Starr and Sinestro. The Spectre is also seen searching for the Entity.

The Butcher eventually tries to possess a man named James Kim whose daughter was cruelly murdered; however, the Spectre prevented it, claiming that the Butcher was too chaotic and too dangerous to be left alone on Earth, and as he tried to kill the rage entity, Atrocitus comes to the rescue.

Taking the opportunity, the Butcher finally possesses James Kim, goading him with words of his daughter's killer to empower its rage which led to James killing the murderer. However, by killing him, James rage began subsiding, forcing the Butcher to choose another host. Atrocitus tricks the entity into exposing itself, and with the help of the Spectre, Atrocitus manages to contain the entity in the red lantern battery by chanting the Red Lantern Corps oath.

Later, when Krona is attempting to obtain the last of the entities, he uses Ophidian's powers to get Atrocitus to release The Butcher and claim it. During the assault on Oa, Krona allows the Butcher and the other entities (except for Parallax) to take one of the six remaining Guardians as hosts. The Butcher was eventually freed from Krona's control after Hal Jordan defeated and killed the rogue Guardian. The Butcher roamed at large in the universe once again. The Butcher soon began suffering from a strange illness, later revealed to be the reservoir of the emotional spectrum becoming exhausted. After Relic wiped out the Blue Lantern Corps and forcefully drained the green light from Oa's Central Power Battery and destroying the planet in the process, the Butcher sacrifices himself, passing into the Source Wall to repair the emotional spectrum.

However, it appears that a new rage entity has since been born from the excess rage left on Earth from the war with Atrocitus. During the Rebirth run, Atrocitus enacts a scheme to take Earth as a new homeworld for the Red Lanterns dubbing this endeavor as the prophetic Red Dawn in following after the Blackest Night and Brightest Day occurrences. In the aftermath, a new Rage Entity is currently growing in the center of the Earth's core which will grow and feed on humanity's wrath until it is mature enough to bring about what he's envisioned.

Oath
Like other Corps in the DC Universe, Atrocitus created an oath for the Red Lanterns to use when recharging their rings. As the other members of his Corps are rarely seen as being capable of speech, it's unknown how often they use it (if they are able to at all). However, it has been shown how Atrocitus is able to restore intelligence and abstract thought, along with full speech capabilities, to his fellow Red Lanterns by the use of his shamanistic magic, making them able to recite the full oath. The Red Lantern Corps oath is recited as follows:

Green Lantern: The Animated Series features an adjusted version of this oath:

Aya also created an alternative that was ultimately unable to activate the ring and battery:

Powers and abilities

Red Lantern power rings are fueled by rage; both within their users as well as that of the sentient beings around them. Like all Lantern Corps, the red power rings give their users the ability to fly at light speed and survive in deep space. A chief characteristic of a Red Lantern's anatomy is that they have corrosive plasma-like blood capable of eating away at the constructs and protective auras of other Lanterns, depleting ring energy at a much faster pace. As such, a Red Lantern's signature move in battle is to regurgitate their “blood” onto a target - causing their skin to ignite into ethereal flame and their rage to flare up, fueling the Lantern's ring.

Because the red power rings completely take over the circulatory functions of their users, removing a Red Lantern's heart (or equivalent organ) will only temporarily incapacitate them. Likewise, removing the ring itself without the intervention of a Blue Lantern's curative powers to reverse its effects will kill the user almost instantaneously. Interestingly, Red Lantern blood is the only thing that can burn through a Black Lantern's host corpse faster than its own power ring can regenerate it.

The combined powers of blue and green rings can destroy a red ring. Also, if the heart of the wearer fills with love, which is the opposite emotion to rage in the Emotional Spectrum, the rage gets compromised and the connection with the ring breaks, instantly destroying the ring. But the light of a Blue Lantern is still needed to heal the former Red Lantern because his/her heart goes into cardiac arrest by the lack of blood. To date, Mera is the only Red Lantern who was freed this way. Though most red ring wielders are little more than beasts driven by rage, individuals with strong willpower are able to manipulate the energy to create constructs. The Red Lantern ring is unique in that the user can manipulate its base of power, rage. A Red Lantern can detect the rage in the heart of others and, by connection, the blood that pumps that rage. Those who face a Red Lantern already in a state of anger are even more vulnerable to a red power ring's attack, as their anger only feeds the attack and increases its destructive power.

The red power ring has also displayed a number of weaknesses as well. To wear a red power ring is to be overtaken by the red light of rage, reducing the wearer to act on pure instinct, driven to kill and destroy with little reason or forethought. Supposedly because Atrocitus is the creator of the corps, he is one of the few who has retained his personality. This was done through sheer willpower, which may be why he is the only Red Lantern capable of creating hard light constructs, though a Blue Lantern can, at least partially, restore a Red Lantern's cognitive functions while retaining their Red Lantern abilities. If a Red Lantern Ring wielder is placed in the Lake of Blood on Ysmault, he or she will have their intelligence restored. Atrocitus intentionally set the rings to select beings who cannot control their rage, and the rings have attempted to leave wielders who gain control of their rage on a few occasions (although as all of these were with members of the Green Lantern Corps, they may be set instead to leave those whose willpower is too strong to be influenced).

In the new continuum, the red rings are either given or revealed to have a host of other powers due to their scientific/mystical origin. Through Atrocitus' foul craft using a lantern called the Rage Mother, he could resurrect any number of Red Lanterns previously killed through her plasmoid blood. The rings themselves have unique properties to them that only some of the more coherent Lanterns can access. One example is rage telepathy, where a user can lock onto a person's rage and sift through their mindscape to learn what they wish to know from the individual, as well as summarily execute them in a visceral fashion if deemed guilty. The only drawback is if the user isn't strong enough to handle such baleful thought processes, their minds will be overwhelmed. In those whose fury, as their minds, are particularly powerful, they undergo startling transformations. Rankorr of Earth and Shekeo of Primeen gained a semblance which seemed to physically manifest their inherent fury, making them tougher and stronger than many of their feral brethren while also maintaining their cognitive functions after a fashion. Other powers include learning different abilities from other ring wielders by partaking of some of their blood, as was the case with Dex-Starr who used it to save his handler and master Atrocitus.

Other versions

The Lightsmiths
In the universe prior to the current one, groups managed to tap into the wellspring of power created by the Emotional Spectrum. In this universe, those who tapped into the red light were known as the Lightsmiths of the Red Light of Fury and were the ones that rejected Relic.

Reception
Critical reception for the Red Lantern Corps has been mixed. Their first appearance, during the Final Crisis event in 2008, was met with a mostly positive critical response. Jesse Schedeen, writing for IGN, remarked that "the Red Lanterns are an excellent addition to the increasingly crowded Lantern mythos." J. Montes, writing for Weekly Comic Book Review, noted that "The Red Lanterns are vicious and make the relentlessness of the Sinestro Corps almost wimpy by comparison." Likewise, Red Lantern Bleez's origin story, as told in Blackest Night: Tales of the Corps #2, received widespread praise, particularly for Eddie Barrows's artwork.

Their solo series, launched in 2011 as part of the New 52, initially received a mixed to negative response. Most reviewers praised the artwork by Ed Benes and Miguel Sepulveda, while criticizing the weak plot, inconsistent characterization, and uneven pacing of the story.

In other media

Television
 The Red Lantern Corps appear in Green Lantern: The Animated Series, consisting of Atrocitus, Zilius Zox, Bleez, Veon, and Skallox as well as series original characters Razer — a "reformed" Red Lantern who seeks to escape his past by working with the Green Lantern Corps. This version of the group are fully in control of their actions as their rings' energy do not produce negative side effects in them or their targets despite being more powerful than the Green Lantern rings' energy. While Red Lantern energy can be negated by that of the Blue Lantern Corps, extreme anger can overcome this limitation. Additionally, anger is not treated as inherently negative depending on the user and their intentions as Red Lantern energy covers a broad definition of anger, ranging from rage on one end and righteous fury on the other. Membership into the Red Lantern Corps is voluntary, with Red Lanterns being able to safely remove their rings without dying, and preaching a fascist-protectionist ethos and cult of personality centered around the veneration of Atrocitus as a prophet figure.
 The Red Lantern Corps appear in the Justice League Action episode "Rage of the Red Lanterns", consisting of Atrocitus, Zilius Zox, Bleez, Skallox, and Dex-Starr. They pursue Lobo to Earth after he steals three newly created Red Lantern rings and fight the Justice League until Lobo acquires the Spider Gauntlet and attacks both parties, who join forces to defeat Lobo. The Red Lantern Corps recover the stolen rings and return to their base while Lobo is taken to an intergalactic prison. In "Unleashed", Dex-Starr is sent to Earth to help orchestrate a Red Lantern invasion in the Justice League's absence until he is defeated by Krypto and Streaky the Supercat with help from Plastic Man.
 The Red Lantern Corps appear in a photograph in the DC Super-Hero Girls episode "#RageCat".

Video games
 The Red Lantern Corps appear in DC Universe Online as part of the "War of the Light: Part I" DLC pack, consisting of Atrocitus and Vice.
 An unidentified Red Lantern appears in the background of the Metropolis stage of Injustice: Gods Among Us.
 The Red Lantern Corps appear in Lego Batman 3: Beyond Gotham, consisting of Atrocitus, Bleez, and Dex-Starr.
 Atrocitus and Dex-Starr appear in Injustice 2.

Toys
 Atrocitus and Bleez were both featured in the DC Comics Super Hero Collection.
 Red Lanterns Skallox, Dex-Starr, and Nite-Lik were featured in the Green Lantern Classics toyline in 2011.
 Atrocitus, Mera, and Dex-Starr were released as part of the Blackest Night collection.
 A Red Lantern Guy Gardner figure was released as part of the Green Lantern, Series 4 collection.
 Atrocitus is part of DC Universe Club Infinite Earths.

Collected editions
 Red Lanterns Vol. 1: Blood and Rage (Red Lanterns #1–7)
 Red Lanterns Vol. 2: Death of the Red Lanterns (Red Lanterns #8–12 and Stormwatch #9)
 Stormwatch Vol. 2: Enemies of Earth (Red Lanterns #10 and Stormwatch #7–12)
 Red Lanterns Vol. 3: The Second Prophecy (Red Lanterns #13–20, #0, Green Lantern (vol. 5) #20)
 Green Lantern : Rise of the Third Army (collects Green Lantern Annual #1, Green Lantern (vol. 5) #13–16, Green Lantern Corps (vol. 3) #13–16, Green Lantern: New Guardians #13–16, Red Lantern #13–16, Green Lantern Corps Annual #1, 416 pages, Hardcover, September 10, 2013)
 Green Lantern: Wrath of the First Lantern (collects Green Lantern vol. 5 #17–20, Green Lantern Corps vol. 3 #17–20, Green Lantern: New Guardians #17–20, Red Lantern #17–20, 416 pages, hardcover, February 25, 2014)
 Red Lanterns Vol. 4: Blood Brothers (collects Red Lanterns #21–26, Green Lantern Annual #2, 176 pages, Paperback, June 3, 2014)
 Green Lantern: Lights Out (collects Green Lantern #24, Green Lantern Corps #24, Green Lantern: New Guardians #23-24, Red Lanterns #24, Green Lantern Annual #2, Green Lantern #23.1: Relic, 192 pages, Hardcover, June 24, 2014)
 Red Lanterns Vol. 5: Atrocities (collects Green Lantern/Red Lanterns #28, Red Lanterns #27, #29-34, Red Lanterns Annual #1, Supergirl #31, 272 pages, Paperback, December 9, 2014)
 Red Lanterns Vol. 6: Forged in Blood (collects Red Lanterns #35-40, Red Lanterns: Futures End #1, Paperback, 2015)

References

External links
 

Characters created by Geoff Johns
Characters created by Ethan Van Sciver
DC Comics supervillain teams
DC Comics aliens
DC Comics demons
DC Comics extraterrestrial supervillains
Green Lantern characters
DC Comics superhero teams